There are approximately 210,000 Chinese people in the United Arab Emirates as of 2022, 150,000 of which are in Dubai. Many Chinese expatriates hail from the Wenzhou region; they are mostly businessmen and merchants who run hundreds of commodity shops through the Emirates. Chinese culture in the Emirates has a sizeable presence; there are many Chinese restaurants in Dubai.

Dragon Mart

The Chinese-themed Dragon Mart is a set of two adjacent shopping malls in the China Cluster of Dubai International City, a suburb of Dubai. It is 1.2 kilometre long and is the "largest Chinese retail trading hub outside mainland China". It includes the largest concentration of Chinese businesses in the UAE.

See also 
 China–United Arab Emirates relations
 Expatriates in the United Arab Emirates

References

Asian diaspora in the United Arab Emirates
United Arab Emirates
Chinese diaspora in Asia